Ramesh Chand Bind (born 7 March 1974) is an Indian politician. He was elected to the Lok Sabha, lower house of the Parliament of India from Bhadohi  in the 2019 Indian general election as member of the Bharatiya Janta Party.

Early life
Bind was born on 7 March 1974 to Ram Chander and Chhabiya Devi in Mirzapur, Uttar Pradesh. He did his Matriculation from S.A.B.H.S. School, Chandaipur, Mirzapur in 1988. He has a Bachelor of Ayurveda, Medicine and Surgery degree. He is married to Samudra Bind, with whom he has two daughters and a son. He lives in Itwa village in Mirzapur district of Uttar Pradesh.

References

1974 births
India MPs 2019–present
Lok Sabha members from Uttar Pradesh
Bharatiya Janata Party politicians from Uttar Pradesh
People from Mirzapur district
Living people